Stanislav Seman (born 8 August 1952) is a former football goalkeeper from Czechoslovakia. He was a member of the national team that won the gold medal at the 1980 Summer Olympics in Moscow. Seman obtained a total number of fifteen caps for his native country, between 30 April 1980 and 20 June 1982. He was born in Košice.

References

External links
 
 
 
 
 

1952 births
Living people
Sportspeople from Košice
Association football goalkeepers
Slovak footballers
Czechoslovak footballers
Czechoslovakia international footballers
Footballers at the 1980 Summer Olympics
Olympic gold medalists for Czechoslovakia
Olympic footballers of Czechoslovakia
UEFA Euro 1980 players
1982 FIFA World Cup players
Slovak football managers
FC VSS Košice managers
Nea Salamis Famagusta FC players
Expatriate footballers in Cyprus
Olympic medalists in football
Czechoslovak expatriate footballers
Czechoslovak expatriate sportspeople in Cyprus
Cypriot First Division players
Medalists at the 1980 Summer Olympics
FC Lokomotíva Košice players
FK Dukla Banská Bystrica players